Snæfell may refer to:

Iceland
 Snæfellsjökull, a mountain (1,446 m) with its big glacier on top, in western Iceland
 Snæfell, a mountain (1,833 m) northeast of Vatnajökull, in the eastern region of Iceland
 Snæfell, a mountain (1,383 m) southeast of Vatnajökull near Jökulsárlón glacier lake
 Ungmennafélagið Snæfell, a sports club in Stykkishólmur
 Snæfell/UDN, a football club in Iceland.

Isle of Man
 Snaefell, a mountain
  Snaefell Mountain Course, a motor sports track